Jerry Sanders may refer to:

 Jerry Sanders (businessman) (born 1936), co-founder and CEO of American semiconductor manufacturer Advanced Micro Devices (AMD)
 Jerry Don Sanders (born 1948), American football player and coach
 Jerry Sanders (politician) (born 1950), American politician in California